Auchenhove Castle is a castle, of which little remains, dating from the 16th century,  north-east of Aboyne, at Auchenhove, Aberdeenshire, Scotland.

Alternatively it may be known as Easter Mains or Auchinhove.

History
The castle was built by the Duguid family.  It was burned by the army of the Duke of Cumberland in 1746 during the Jacobite rising.  The estate belonged to the Duguids from about 1434.

Structure
It appears to have been a late courtyard house, with a causeway approach.

External links
Photograph

References

Castles in Aberdeenshire